The W.D. Mansfield Memorial Bridge, commonly known as the Dravosburg Bridge, is a cantilever bridge that carries vehicular traffic across the Monongahela River between McKeesport, Pennsylvania and Dravosburg, Pennsylvania. It is a high-level bridge, passing over railyard, industrial sites, and Route 837, to connect Fifth Avenue in McKeesport and Richland Avenue in Dravosburg.

History
This structure replaced the low-level 1889 Dravosburg-Reynoldton Bridge. The steel from the Wabash Bridge (Pittsburgh), demolished in 1948,  was used in the construction of this bridge.

As built, the Mansfield Bridge carried trolley tracks of Pittsburgh Railways route 56 McKeesport via 2nd Avenue. The trolley line was replaced by a bus on September 5, 1963.

The bridge is named for McKeesport politician William D. Mansfield, who served as an Allegheny County Commissioner and later as a State Senator.

See also
List of crossings of the Monongahela River

References

Bridges over the Monongahela River
Bridges in Allegheny County, Pennsylvania
Road bridges in Pennsylvania
McKeesport, Pennsylvania
Steel bridges in the United States
Cantilever bridges in the United States